Angel Manolov (born 30 December 1981 in Karnalovo, Blagoevgrad) is a Bulgarian footballer. He plays as a goalkeeper for Botev Lukovit

External links
 Angel Manolov Stats at Utakmica.rs

1981 births
Living people
Bulgarian footballers
Bulgarian expatriate footballers
Association football goalkeepers
PFC Belasitsa Petrich players
OFC Pirin Blagoevgrad players
FK Hajduk Kula players
PFC Spartak Pleven players
First Professional Football League (Bulgaria) players
Serbian SuperLiga players
Expatriate footballers in Serbia